Guanine nucleotide-binding protein G(I)/G(S)/G(O) subunit gamma-13 is a protein that in humans is encoded by the GNG13 gene.

Interactions 

GNG13 has been shown to interact with GNB5.

References

Further reading